Eunice Caballero (born January 1, 1973) is a Cuban sport shooter. She competed at the 2000 Summer Olympics in the women's 50 metre rifle three positions event, in which she tied for 30th place, and the women's 10 metre air rifle event, in which she tied for 36th place.

References

1973 births
Living people
ISSF rifle shooters
Cuban female sport shooters
Olympic shooters of Cuba
Shooters at the 2000 Summer Olympics
Pan American Games medalists in shooting
Pan American Games silver medalists for Cuba
Shooters at the 1995 Pan American Games
20th-century Cuban women
20th-century Cuban people